The  is a railway line in Kyushu, Japan, operated by the Kyushu Railway Company (JR Kyushu). It connects Kōhoku Station in Kōhoku, Saga Prefecture to Sasebo Station in Sasebo, Nagasaki Prefecture. It is part of the route connecting Sasebo with Saga and Fukuoka. Most of the line runs parallel to National Routes 34 and 35. From 1898 to 1934 the Hizen-Yamaguchi - Haiki section was part of the original Nagasaki Main Line.

History
The Kyushu Railway Co. opened the Yamaguchi (present-day Kōhoku) - Takeo (present-day Takeo-Onsen) section in 1895 as part of the original Nagasaki Main Line. It was extended to Haiki in 1897, and to Sasebo the following year. The company was nationalised in 1907.

In 1934 the Hizen-Yamaguchi (present-day Kōhoku) - Isahaya line opened as the new Nagasaki Main line, with the line being renamed the Sasebo Line. The history of the line beyond Sasebo is covered under the Matsuura Line.

The entire line was electrified in 1976, and freight service ceased between Haiki - Sasebo in 1985, Arita - Haiki in 1987 and on the balance of the line in 1996.

The section between Takahashi station and Omachi station will be double-tracked as the current compromise until the construction of the Kyushu Shinkansen Nagasaki route between Takeo-Onsen and Shin-Tosu can be decided.

Former connecting lines
 Takahashi station - Yutoku Railway Co. opened a 24.2 km 915mm (3') gauge line to Yutoku Inari Shrine between 1904 and 1907, and a 1.5 km branch line to the south of Hyakkan Bridge in 1909. Both lines closed in 1931. The 9.8 km 1067mm gauge Hizen Electric Railway Co. line to Ureshino, electrified at 600 VDC, connected to this line and operated between 1915 and 1931.
 Sasebo station - A 5 km line to a US Forces Japan oil storage facility operated between 1950 and 1978.

Route data
 Operators and distances
 JR Kyushu
 From Kōhoku to Sasebo: 48.8 km (30.3 mi)
 JR Freight
 From Kōhoku to Arita: 28.2 km (17.5 mi)
 Track gauge: 
 Stations: 14
 Double-track: Ōmachi - Takahashi
 Electrified track: Whole line
 Maximum speed: 120 km/h (75 mph)

Rolling stock

 783 series (whole line, limited express Midori/Huis Ten Bosch)
 415 series (whole line)
 813 series (between Hizen-Yamaguchi and Haiki)
 817 series (whole line)
 KiHa 66/67 DMUs (between Sasebo and Haiki)
 KiHa 200 DMUs (between Sasebo and Haiki)

Stations
●： Station stop

References

 
Lines of Kyushu Railway Company
1067 mm gauge railways in Japan